is a 2017 Japanese comedy mystery fantasy film directed by Masayuki Suzuki, written by Tomoko Aizawa and starring Haruka Ayase, Shinichi Tsutsumi, Gaku Hamada, Hiroyuki Hirayama, Masahiro Takashima, Masaomi Kondō and Morio Kazama. It was released in Japan by Toho on 14 January 2017.

Plot
A woman visiting Kyoto finds that she has no reservation at the hotel where she intended to stay. She then finds a quaint, historic hotel, built near the site of the Honnō-ji incident, that happens to have a room available. On riding the elevator to her room she consumes a piece of konpeitō, and unexpectedly finds herself transported to the namesake temple in feudal Japan. Despite the perils of her unexplained presence, over several such trips she befriends the warlord Oda Nobunaga, who turns out to be a well-known but tragic historical figure.

Cast
Haruka Ayase as Mayuko Kuramoto
Shinichi Tsutsumi as Oda Nobunaga
Gaku Hamada as Mori Ranmaru
Hiroyuki Hirayama

Masahiro Takashima as Akechi Mitsuhide
Masaomi Kondō
Morio Kazama
Kiichi Nakai as Narrator

Reception

References

External links
 

Japanese comedy mystery films
Japanese fantasy comedy films
2010s comedy mystery films
2010s fantasy comedy films
2010s Japanese films
Toho films
Films about time travel
Films set in Japan
Films set in the 16th century
Films set in feudal Japan
Cultural depictions of Akechi Mitsuhide 
Cultural depictions of Oda Nobunaga